The men's 400 metre freestyle S8 event at the 2012 Paralympic Games took place on 31 August, at the London Aquatics Centre in the Olympic Park, London. The event was for athletes included in the S8 classification, which is for competitors with physical impairments. Twelve swimmers took part, representing eight nations. China's Yinan Wang won the gold medal with British brothers Oliver and Sam Hynd taking silver and bronze respectively.

Results
Key
 Qualified for next round
AS = Asian record
AM = America's record

Heats
Two heats were held, each with six swimmers; the swimmers with the eight fastest times advanced to the final. The heats took place on 31 August starting at 9:30 BST.

Heat 1

Heat 2

Final
China's Yinan Wang won the gold medal in a time of four minutes 27.11 seconds, setting a new Asian record.

References

Swimming at the 2012 Summer Paralympics